Liberty Township is one of the fifteen townships of Hardin County, Ohio, United States. As of the 2010 census the population was 7,712, up from 7,149 at the 2000 census. 1,760 of the population lived in the unincorporated portion of the township in 2010.

Geography
Located in the northwestern corner of the county, it borders the following townships:
Orange Township, Hancock County - north
Van Buren Township, Hancock County - northeast corner
Washington Township - east
Cessna Township - southeast corner
Marion Township - south
Auglaize Township, Allen County - southwest corner
Jackson Township, Allen County - west
Richland Township, Allen County - northwest corner

The village of Ada is located in central Liberty Township.

Name and history
Liberty Township was organized in 1837. It is one of twenty-five Liberty Townships statewide.

Government
The township is governed by a three-member board of trustees, who are elected in November of odd-numbered years to a four-year term beginning on the following January 1. Two are elected in the year after the presidential election and one is elected in the year before it. There is also an elected township fiscal officer, who serves a four-year term beginning on April 1 of the year after the election, which is held in November of the year before the presidential election. Vacancies in the fiscal officership or on the board of trustees are filled by the remaining trustees.

References

External links
County website

Townships in Hardin County, Ohio
Townships in Ohio
1837 establishments in Ohio